Dacher Joseph Keltner is a Mexican-born American professor of psychology at University of California, Berkeley, who directs the Berkeley Social Interaction Lab. He is also the founder and faculty director of the Greater Good Science Center, host of the podcast The Science of Happiness, and Chief Scientific Advisor of Hume AI.

Biography
Keltner was born in Jalisco, Mexico, to two early members of the counterculture.  Keltner's mother, a literature professor, and father, an artist, raised both him and his brother in Laurel Canyon in the late 1960s. When his mother secured her first job as a professor in 1970, they moved to a conservative town in the foothills of the California Sierra Nevada.

Keltner received his B.A. in psychology and sociology from the University of California, Santa Barbara, in 1984, he received his Ph.D. from Stanford University in 1989, and he completed three years of post-doctoral work with Paul Ekman at the University of California, San Francisco.

Academic career
Keltner began his academic career at the University of Wisconsin–Madison, and then returned to  University of California, Berkeley's Psychology Department in 1996 attaining full professorship in 2002.

His research focuses on the biological and evolutionary origins of compassion, awe, love, beauty, and power, social class, and social inequality.

Keltner is the co-author of two textbooks, as well as the best-selling Born to Be Good: The Science of a Meaningful Life, The Compassionate Instinct, and most recently, in May 2016, The Power Paradox: How We Gain and Lose Influence. Keltner has published over 190 scientific articles, he has written for The New York Times Magazine, The New York Times, The London Times, The Wall Street Journal, SLATE, Utne Reader, and has received numerous national prizes and grants for his research.  His research has been covered in Time, Newsweek, The New York Times, the BBC, CNN, NPR, The Wall Street Journal, and in many other outlets, and been a focus in two panels with the Dalai Lama.

His Science of Happiness MOOC at EdX has had over 300,000 enrollees. Keltner has received the outstanding teacher and research mentor awards from UC Berkeley, and seen 20 of his PhD students and post-doctoral fellows become professors. Wired magazine recently rated his podcasts from his course Emotion as one of the five best educational downloads, and the Utne Reader selected Keltner for one of its 50 2008 visionaries.

Keltner has collaborated with directors at Pixar, including film director and animator Pete Docter in preparation of his 2015 film Inside Out. He has worked and continues to work with Facebook engineers and designers on projects such as Facebook stickers and Facebook reactions. He has also worked on projects at Google on altruism and emotion, and was recently featured in Tom Shadyac’s movie I Am.

Keltner is also collaborating with the Sierra Club to get veterans and inner city kids outdoors.  Building upon his experiences in a restorative justice program with prisoners in San Quentin Prison, Keltner wrote a brief for a case – Ashker v. Governor of California – that led to the curtailment of solitary confinement in maximum-security prisons in California.

Theory of power 
Together with Deborah H. Gruenfeld of the Stanford Graduate School of Business and Cameron Anderson, psychologist at the Haas School of Business at UC Berkeley, Keltner has developed the Approach/Inhibition Theory of Power, which aims to present an integrative account of the effects of power on human behavior, suggesting that the acquisition of power has a disinhibiting effect regarding the social consequences of exercising it.

Science of happiness
In his book Born to be Good: The Science of a Meaningful Life, Keltner explores the science behind well-being. The book attempts to counter the bias that we are wired to be self-interested. Keltner explores the Confucian idea of the jen ratio; the relationship between actions that bring the good of others to completion and those that bring out bad. The greater score is a direct relation to your happiness. In the book he touches on the qualities of gratitude, compassion, play, awe, embarrassment and teasing and how these qualities are innate in people but also can be developed.

Personal life
Keltner lives in Berkeley, California ,with his wife, Mollie McNeil, an alumna of UC Berkeley, and their two daughters Natalie and Serafina.

Books
 Keltner, Dacher. The Power Paradox: How We Gain and Lose Influence. Penguin, 2016. ;
Keltner, Dacher, Jason Marsh, and Jeremy Adam Smith, editors, The Compassionate Instinct: The Science of Human Goodness. New York: W. W. Norton & Co., 2010. 
 Keltner, Dacher. Born to Be Good: The Science of a Meaningful Life. W. W. Norton, 2009. .
 Keltner, Dacher, Keith Oatley, and Jennifer M. Jenkins. Understanding Emotions 3rd ed. ; prev. ed. published by Blackwell Publishers, 1996.
Gilovich, Thomas, Dacher Keltner, and Richard E. Nisbett. Social Psychology. New York: W. W. Norton, 2006 ISBN

References

External links
 Biography at the Berkeley Social Interaction Laboratory
 Greater Good Magazine
 Greater Good Science Center
 Video: Keltner discusses whether Technology Dependence is De-Evolving Human Emotion, Fora.tv (Los Angeles Public Library, February 5, 2009)
 Video: We Are Built to Be Kind, published on December 2, 2014 - Dacher Keltner challenges popular notions of human nature and seeks to explain why mammals evolved emotions such as empathy
 Human Happiness Course by Keltner at UC Berkeley Webcasts

Year of birth missing (living people)
Living people
University of California, Berkeley College of Letters and Science faculty
University of California, San Francisco alumni
University of California, Santa Barbara alumni
Stanford University alumni
Positive psychologists